The following events occurred in August 1924:

August 1, 1924 (Friday)
Koshien Stadium opened near Kobe, Japan.
Born: King Abdullah of Saudi Arabia, in Riyadh (official birth date) (d. 2015); Georges Charpak, physicist and Nobel Prize laureate (d. 2010); Michael Stewart, playwright, in New York City (d. 1987)

August 2, 1924 (Saturday)
The Allied Powers agreed in principle to the Dawes Plan and invited Germany to the London conference. 
In the round-the-world flight attempt, one flyer in the team reached Iceland from Kirkwall, but the Boston was forced to make an emergency landing in the Atlantic Ocean and sank while being towed for repairs. The crew was rescued. The other two surviving planes continued on.
Born: James Baldwin, writer, in Harlem, New York (d. 1987); Carroll O'Connor, actor, producer and director, in Manhattan, New York (d. 2001)

August 3, 1924 (Sunday)
Germany observed its first memorial day on the tenth anniversary of its declaration of war on France. Outside the Reichstag a special ceremony was held as prayers for the dead were recited, church bells rang and a gun salute was fired. At the stroke of noon the entire country came to a standstill for two minutes of silence. Communists disrupted the moment of silence at the Reichstag by shouting slogans and throwing red leaflets into the air until police moved in with their clubs to restore order. Many fist fights also broke out in the crowd between various extremist political factions.
Berlin Jews held a separate service for Jewish soldiers, as a Jewish preacher was forbidden from delivering a prayer in the Reichstag ceremony.
The Soviet raid on Stołpce occurred.
Giuseppe Campari of Italy won the 1924 French Grand Prix.
Born: Leon Uris, novelist, in Baltimore, Maryland (d. 2003)
Died: Joseph Conrad, 66, Polish-born author

August 4, 1924 (Monday)
Jamaican-born political leader Marcus Garvey was indicted by a grand jury for filing an allegedly fraudulent income tax return for 1921.

August 5, 1924 (Tuesday)
The German delegation, including Chancellor Wilhelm Marx and Foreign Minister Gustav Stresemann, joined the London reparations conference.
John Ross Campbell was charged under the Incitement to Mutiny Act 1797 for the July 25 editorial in Workers' Weekly. The British public became bitterly split on what was known as the Campbell Case, as conservatives wanted Campbell locked up while liberals said that rights to free speech were being suppressed.
The comic strip Little Orphan Annie first appeared.
The film Janice Meredith premiered at the Cosmopolitan Theatre in New York City.

August 6, 1924 (Wednesday)
Britain and Turkey agreed to submit their territorial dispute over the Mosul Question to the League of Nations.
The Treaty of Lausanne went into effect.
Born: Ella Jenkins, folk singer, in St. Louis, Missouri (alive in 2021)

August 7, 1924 (Thursday)
Japan and the Soviet Union began negotiations to bring about a normalization of relations.
Junior F.C. was founded in Colombia.
Club Universitario de Deportes was founded in Peru.
Born: Kenneth Kendall, broadcaster, in British India (d. 2012)
Died: Bruce Grit, 68, ex-slave and African-American historian

August 8, 1924 (Friday)
The United Kingdom signed a commercial treaty with the Soviet Union, giving British exports most favoured nation status in exchange for granting a loan to the Russian government.
The Fortune Theatre opened in Westminster, London.

August 9, 1924 (Saturday)
In the first boxing match ever staged at Wembley Stadium, Tommy Gibbons knocked out Jack Bloomfield in the third round of a bout staged as part of the British Empire Exhibition.
The 2nd World Scout Jamboree opened in Denmark.

August 10, 1924 (Sunday)
Austrian police said they had uncovered a Soviet slush fund used for stirring up unrest and revolt in the Balkans.
Born: Nancy Buckingham, gothic and romance novelist, in Bristol, England (alive in 2021)

August 11, 1924 (Monday)
The historical drama film Monsieur Beaucaire, starring Rudolph Valentino and Bebe Daniels, was released.
Lee de Forest filmed U.S. President Calvin Coolidge on the White House lawn using his experimental Phonofilm sound-on-film process, resulting in the earliest sound film footage of an American president.
Anti-British riots broke out in Atbarah in Sudan. British troops fired on mutineering Egyptian railway labourers, killing 10.

August 12, 1924 (Tuesday)
Paris newspaper Le Journal claimed to have indisputable proof that the Soviet Union had established a secret tribunal assigned with the task of creating revolutionary activity in European colonies. 
Ex-boxing champion Kid McCoy came home drunk to his Los Angeles apartment and violently murdered his live-in mistress after she told him what her friends thought of him.
Born: Derek Shackleton, cricketer, in Todmorden, England (d. 2007); Muhammad Zia-ul-Haq, President of Pakistan, in Jalandhar, British India (d. 1988)

August 13, 1924 (Wednesday)
Kid McCoy went to a shop owned by his mistress' husband looking to kill him as well, but he was not present so McCoy took 11 hostages, shooting one in the leg who tried to escape. When his intended target failed to show up, McCoy fled until police apprehended him.
The mutiny charge against John Ross Campbell was dropped when Crown barrister Travers Humphreys appeared before the court and explained, "Since process has been issued in this case it has been represented that the object and intention of the article in question was not to endeavour to seduce men in the fighting forces from their duty and allegiance, or to induce them to disobey lawful orders, but that it was comment upon armed military force being used by the State for the suppression of industrial disputes." He also said he had been instructed not to offer any evidence upon the charge, and so Campbell was freed. Attorney General Sir Patrick Hastings had gotten cold feet after learning that Campbell was an injured war veteran and that a trial before a jury was likely to fail; prosecution was also opposed by Labour government backbenchers.

August 14, 1924 (Thursday)
Thousands were reported dead in flooding in the Zhili and Hunan regions of China.
U.S. President Calvin Coolidge formally accepted the nomination for re-election in a speech at the Memorial Continental Hall in Washington, saying the people wanted "a government of common sense."
Born: Holger Juul Hansen, actor, in Nyborg, Denmark (d. 2013)

August 15, 1924 (Friday)
Misericordia University was founded in Dallas, Pennsylvania.
Born: Werner Abrolat, actor, in Tilsit, East Prussia (d. 1997); Robert Bolt, playwright and screenwriter, in Sale, Greater Manchester, England (d. 1995); Phyllis Schlafly, lawyer and conservative activist, in St. Louis, Missouri (d. 2016)
Died: Francis Knollys, 1st Viscount Knollys, 87, British Private Secretary to King Edward VII

August 16, 1924 (Saturday)
An agreement to enact the Dawes Plan was signed in London by the European powers, pending formal ratification by the respective parliaments of the countries concerned. The French and Belgians agreed to end their occupation of the Ruhr in one year's time.
The body of Giacomo Matteotti was found hastily buried in a shallow ditch outside of Rome.
Born: Inez Voyce, baseball player, in Rathbun, Iowa (d. 2022)
Died: Roy Daugherty, 54, Old Western outlaw (killed in gunfight with lawmen)

August 17, 1924 (Sunday)
Two priests and two policemen were reported killed and many injured in rioting in Mandalay, Burma that occurred over the course of a political procession led by a Buddhist priest associated with a movement for home rule.
300 casualties were reported in Gulbarga, India during Hindu-Muslim rioting there.
The Victor Fleming-directed drama film Empty Hands was released.
Born: Evan S. Connell, writer, in Kansas City, Missouri (d. 2013)
Died: Pavel Urysohn, 26, Russian mathematician (drowned)

August 18, 1924 (Monday)
The occupied towns of Offenburg and Appenweier were evacuated by French troops as a gesture of good faith on France's part to enact the London pact.
The two planes attempting to fly around the world were damaged attempting to take off from Reykjavik to Greenland because they were too loaded down with gasoline.

August 19, 1924 (Tuesday)
The state began its closing arguments in the Leopold and Loeb trial.
Charles G. Dawes formally accepted the U.S. vice presidential nomination in a speech on the lawn of his Evanston, Illinois home.
Greek football club Niki Volos F.C. was founded.
Born: Willard Boyle, physicist, in Amherst, Nova Scotia, Canada (d. 2011)

August 20, 1924 (Wednesday)
South Carolina Senator Nathaniel B. Dial and his challenger for the Democratic Party's nomination, John J. McMahan, were both arrested for disorderly conduct in Gaffney, South Carolina after a campaign meeting broke up amid threats of violence. Dial approached McMahan brandishing a chair after he charged that McMahan had called him a "dirty liar".
Victor Herbert's final production, the operetta The Dream Girl, opened at the Ambassador Theatre in New York.

August 21, 1924 (Thursday)
World middleweight boxing champion Harry Greb was awarded a newspaper decision over Tiger Flowers in Fremont, Ohio.
The world flyers landed in Frederiksdal, Greenland.

August 22, 1924 (Friday)
Clarence Darrow presented his closing argument in the Leopold and Loeb case.
U.S. presidential candidate John W. Davis condemned the Ku Klux Klan by name in a speech in Sea Girt, New Jersey, reviving an issue that had badly split the Democratic Party at the National Convention. Davis called on President Coolidge to do the same.
The Agatha Christie novel The Man in the Brown Suit was published.
Communists in the Reichstag filibustered Chancellor Wilhelm Marx by causing a loud disturbance of hoots and jeers when he tried to speak on the London conference ahead of a vote on the matter. The session was suspended and police were called in, but no clause could be found by which to arrest those who were causing the disturbance and the Reichstag adjourned for the day.

August 23, 1924 (Saturday)
In a speech in Maine, U.S. vice presidential candidate Charles G. Dawes responded to John W. Davis' challenge of the previous day by also denouncing the Ku Klux Klan by name. He then said that the issue had "no proper place in this or any other campaign."
The Prince of Wales boarded the RMS Berengaria at Ryde and set out for his tour of the United States and Canada. 
Born: David Boyd, artist, in Murrumbeena, Australia (d. 2011); Sherm Lollar, baseball player, in Durham, Arkansas (d. 1977); Robert Solow, economist, in Brooklyn, New York (alive in 2021)
Died: Heinrich Berté, 66, Austro-Hungarian composer

August 24, 1924 (Sunday)
The drama film Lily of the Dust, starring Pola Negri, was released.
Born: Ahmadou Ahidjo, 1st President of Cameroon, in Garoua (d. 1989); Jimmy Gardner, actor, in Newmarket, Suffolk, England (d. 2010); Bob Thompson, composer, arranger and orchestra leader, in San Jose, California (d. 2013)

August 25, 1924 (Monday)
Chancellor Wilhelm Marx told the Reichstag that he would ratify the London agreement whether the Reichstag approved it or not, even if it caused a dissolution of parliament and new elections. 
The drama film The Enemy Sex starring Betty Compson was released.
 Turkey – League of Nations agreement on the Mosul issue
Died: Mariano Álvarez, 106, Filipino revolutionary and statesman

August 26, 1924 (Tuesday)
The Montreal Star published an interview with Henry Ford in which he was quoted as saying that the Ku Klux Klan was "a victim of lying propaganda" and "if the truth were known about it, it would be looked up to as a body of patriots."
Born: Alex Kellner, baseball player, in Tucson, Arizona (d. 1996)
Died: Eugène Py, 65, French film pioneer

August 27, 1924 (Wednesday)
The American Telephone and Telegraph Company announced that a color photograph had been successfully transmitted from Chicago to New York. The process took less than an hour and was done by separating the colors at the point of sending and then reassembling them when received.

August 28, 1924 (Thursday)
The August Uprising broke out in the Georgian Soviet Socialist Republic.
The John Ford-directed Western film The Iron Horse premiered in New York City.
Born: Peggy Ryan, dancer, in Long Beach, California (d. 2004)

August 29, 1924 (Friday)
The German Reichstag voted 314 to 117 to accept the London protocol on the Dawes report. The vote was not expected to pass so easily but moderate right-wing factions gave it their support, giving rise to rumors that they had extracted concessions of cabinet posts in exchange for their vote. Erich Ludendorff marched out after the vote and called it "infamous".
Edward, Prince of Wales arrived in New York City aboard the RMS Berengaria and began his visit to the United States and Canada.
Railway Accident Harrapa India On this day , two trains of indian railway collided near harrapa town of Punjab . This accident resulted in death of 107 passengers & 2 railway servants .

August 30, 1924 (Saturday)
The Dawes Plan was formally put into effect with a signing in London by diplomatic representatives of France, Belgium, Greece, Italy, Japan, Portugal, Serbia, Germany and the United Kingdom.
Six were killed in clashes with the Ku Klux Klan in Herrin, Illinois.
The Prince of Wales met with President Coolidge and his family at the White House in an informal two-hour visit.

August 31, 1924 (Sunday)
Paavo Nurmi set a new world record for the 10,000m race, running a time of 30:06.2. This was the race that Finnish officials did not allow Nurmi to run in the Paris Olympics last month due to fears for his health.
The round-the-world flyers reached continental North America again when they landed at Indian Harbour, Labrador.
The melodrama film Wine, starring Clara Bow in her first lead role, was released.
Born: Buddy Hackett, comedian and actor, in Brooklyn, New York (d. 2003)
Died: Todor Aleksandrov, 43, Macedonian Bulgarian revolutionary

References

1924
1924-08
1924-08